Anastasia Ganias is an American actress, best known for her role as Tracy Togs on HBO's True Blood.

Career 
Since 2008, Anastasia has been guest starring on shows such as Dexter, Parks and Recreation, Desperate Housewives, Party Down, CSI: Miami, and CSI: New York. One of Ganias’ most notable roles to date was a guest starring role as Megan in the multi camera comedy, According to Jim.  Directed by Penny Marshall, Anastasia worked alongside Garry Marshall and Jim Belushi. In film, she starred as Claire in the 2012 award-winning indie comedy Missed Connections, which premiered at the GenArt Film Festival. In 2012, Anastasia was cast as Tracy Togs in the fifth season of True Blood as a recurring character.

Filmography 
Team Marco, (2020)
Its Freezing Out There (2018)

Films

Television

Other credits

References

External links
 

Year of birth missing (living people)
Living people
Actresses from Worcester, Massachusetts
American television actresses
American film actresses
21st-century American women